Glenn LeRoy "Red" Jarrett (October 23, 1907 – April 26, 1962) was an American football and basketball coach. He served as the head football coach at the University of North Dakota in 1942 and from 1946 to 1948, compiling a record of 14–17. Jarret was also the head basketball coach at North Dakota in 1945–46 and from 1949 to 1951, tallying a mark of 39–26.

Head coaching record

Football

References

1907 births
1962 deaths
American men's basketball players
Basketball coaches from Indiana
Basketball players from Indiana
Coaches of American football from Indiana
North Dakota Fighting Hawks athletic directors
North Dakota Fighting Hawks football coaches
North Dakota Fighting Hawks football players
North Dakota Fighting Hawks men's basketball coaches
North Dakota Fighting Hawks men's basketball players
People from Ligonier, Indiana
Players of American football from Indiana